Frederico Ricciardi Pinheiro de Melo (born 13 July 1987 in Azusa, California, United States) is a Portuguese sailor, who specializes in heavyweight one-person dinghy (Finn) and two-person keelboat (Star) classes. He represented his nation Portugal, along with his partner and three-time Olympian Afonso Domingos, at the 2012 Summer Olympics, and has trained throughout his sailing career with Cascais Naval Club in his current residence Cascais, under his personal coach Andy Zawieja. Born and raised in the United States, Melo also held a dual citizenship to compete internationally for his parents' homeland in sailing. As of June 2015, Melo was ranked twentieth in the world for the heavyweight one-person dinghy class by the International Sailing Federation.

Melo qualified for the Portuguese sailing team in the Star class at the 2012 Summer Olympics in London, securing a berth by placing thirteenth at the 2011 ISAF World Championships in Perth, Western Australia. He and his skipper Domingos struggled to mount a challenge against a field of fifteen other boats throughout the ten-race series, ending them in the penultimate position out of sixteen with a net grade of 108.

In 2017-18 he was a crewmember on the boat Turn the Tide on Plastic in the Volvo Ocean Race.

References

External links
 
 
 
  
 NBC Olympics Profile

1987 births
Living people
Portuguese male sailors (sport)
Olympic sailors of Portugal
Sailors at the 2012 Summer Olympics – Star
People from Azusa, California
Sportspeople from California
American people of Portuguese descent
Volvo Ocean Race sailors